The Rawalpindi-Islamabad Metrobus is a  bus rapid transit system operating in the Islamabad–Rawalpindi metropolitan area of Pakistan. It consists of four routes, namely the Red, Orange, Blue, and Green Lines. The Red and Orange Lines have dedicated lanes with proper stations built along them, while the Blue and Green Lines currently run along the Islamabad Expressway and Srinagar Highway respectively, with regular traffic.

The Metrobus network's Red Line was the first to be opened on  june 4, 2015, and stretches 22.5 kilometers between Pak Secretariat, in Islamabad, and Saddar in Rawalpindi. The second route, the Orange Line, stretches 25.6 kilometers between the Peshawar Morr Interchange and the Islamabad International Airport, and was inaugurated on 18 April 2022. On 7 July 2022, the Green Line and Blue Lines were added to this Metrobus network.

The system uses e-ticketing and an Intelligent Transportation System, where the Red Line is managed by the Punjab Mass Transit Authority while the rest are being managed by the Capital Development Authority (CDA).

History
Public transport in Islamabad and Rawalpindi was never been a viable option for commute. Local transport routes existed, but many parts of the city weren't connected to the center of Rawalpindi–Islamabad Metropolitan areas. Therefore, after the completion of the Lahore Metrobus, plans for a similar project in the Rawalpindi–Islamabad Metropolitan area were made.

Phase One: Red Line 

Construction of the bus rapid transit system began on 28 February 2014 and was completed by June 2015, with 60 buses initially plying on the route.

The project was initially divided into five packages, where Package-1 consisted of flyovers, bridges and pedestrian underpasses. The construction project was awarded to Habib Construction Services which is one of the largest construction companies of Pakistan and have worked on several other mega projects previously.

In February of 2023, PMBA announced the creation of express route for Red Lin from Monday till Thursday. These are: Saddar - Faizabad and Faiz Ahmad Faiz - Rehmanabad.

Phase Two: Orange, Green and Blue Lines 

The 25.6 km Orange route track, from Peshawar Morr to New Islamabad International Airport, worth Rs16 billion was started by the PML-N government in 2017 and was originally scheduled for completion in 2018. After a delay of five years, it was inaugurated on 18 April 2022 by Prime Minister Shehbaz Sharif.  Thirty buses were expected to arrive from China for this route, but faced delays due to the COVID-19 pandemic which led to the closure of the Port of Shanghai. Consequently, CDA started the operations on this route by borrowing 15 buses from the Red Line. The Faiz Ahmad Faiz Station of Red Line was turned into an Interchange Station between Red Line and Orange Line.  For the first month of Ramadan, orange line was free to ride on.   

Seeing the dire situation of public transport in Islamabad, the new PML-N government began work on Blue route and Green routes of Rawalpindi - Islamabad Metro Bus. Initially, Blue route is between PIMS and Koral Chowk and Green route is between PIMS and Bhara Kahu before more stops are added on these corridors in the future. For this purpose, 30 buses were ordered from China, of which 15 are plying on Orange route and the rest are plying on Blue and Green routes. 

For the new routes, the Federal Government created the Capital Mass Transit Authority (CMTA) to run the operations of Orange, Green, Blue and all the future metro bus routes.

Phase Three: NUST Proposal 
In late 2022, CDA approached National University of Sciences & Technology (NUST) to carry out the feasibility study to identify new potential routes. As a result of that study, 13 new bus routes were identified by NUST.  The routes are meant to connect the existing Rawalpindi - Islamabad Metro Bus Network to all corners of Islamabad.  

Upon his arrival in Islamabad, the new CDA Chairman Noorul Amin Mengal announced the starting of work on new Purple Line from IJP Station to Pirwadhai on IJP Road and Silver Line from Aabpara to Trammri on Park Road.  The Purple Line busses would ply on the newly constructed IJP Road. The stations are announced to have tuck shops which is a welcome change.

Lines

Stations 

The Functional elements of the Red and Orange Line Stations include ticketing booths, concourse level passenger transfer, escalators, platform screen, public toilets, doors turnstiles for automatic fare collection and all other amenities for passenger convenience. A central ITS control room is also included in the project to control the whole operation of the Metro Bus system.

Meanwhile, stations of Green and Blue Line are ground-level, however, at most places, there are no pedestrian crossings on main highways such as Kashmir Highway. This puts commuters at a grave danger and reduces interest in the service.

Ticketing and fares

The Red and Orange Lines uses e-ticketing and Intelligent Transportation System wand. The ticketing options include a single-ride token and a refillable metro bus card.

On the other hand, the Green and Blue Line don't have any proper standardized ticketing system yet. As of February, 2023, CMTA is working on working on creating a streamline ticketing system for the three routes.

Fleet
The initial fleet consisted of 68 articulated 18-meter-long high-floor buses for the Red Line route. These buses were imported and supplied by VPL Limited from the China-based company Sunwin Bus, which is a Joint-Venture formed between SAIC Motor Corporation Limited (SAIC) and Sweden-based Volvo Bus Company, VPL Limited also happens to be the sole after-sales distributor for both Volvo Buses and Sunwin Buses in Pakistan, among other products.

In 2022, 30 buses were imported from China for the Orange Line route. Fifteen of these buses are plying on the Orange Line route, while ten were shifted over to the Blue Line route and five to the  Green Line route.

Controversies and mishaps
The rainy season of 2015 exposed significant problems in drainage systems of the network. One of the worst affected stations was the PIMS metrobus station, with severe flooding affecting smooth operation severely. Similarly, cracks appeared after a minor earthquake in Rawalpindi, which raised questions over the structural integrity of the infrastructure used in the project. 

The long-term financial model to run the project and its utilization is a subject of serious controversy surrounding the project. Reports show that although 150,000 passengers were expected, but due to both CDA and RDA's lack of interest in creating feeder routes, the project was unable to produce over 80,000 passengers in the long run. It became extremely difficult for management to afford fuel costs for 68 buses, and only 35 buses were utilized. This results in jamming and overcrowding during peak travelling hours. 

The Orange route became controversial when it got delayed for nearly 5 years. It was meant to be inaugurated in August of 2018, however, for one reason of the other, it couldn't be completed till April of 2022. Even after its completion, people noticed electrical and civil works being done in sections of Orange Line track. Furthermore, when the question of operating it came, there was dispute between CDA, NHA and Punjab MetroBus Authority. It was finally decided that CDA would run it until a Metro Bus Authority for Islamabad is created.

See also
Rapid transit in Pakistan
Lahore Metrobus
Multan Metrobus
Karachi Metrobus
TransPeshawar

References

External links
 Punjab Masstransit Authority website
 Punjab transport department website

2015 establishments in Pakistan
Bus rapid transit in Pakistan
Transport in Islamabad
Transport in Rawalpindi